Belfast-Murray River is a provincial electoral district for the Legislative Assembly of Prince Edward Island, Canada. Created mostly from 4th Kings, part of 5th Kings and a small part of 4th Queens in 1996. It was formerly named Murray River-Gaspereaux from 1996 to 2007.

Members
The riding has elected the following Members of the Legislative Assembly:

Election results

Belfast-Murray River, 2007–present

2016 electoral reform plebiscite results

Murray River-Gaspereaux, 1996–2007

References

 Belfast-Murray River information

Prince Edward Island provincial electoral districts